Sylphes is the second album by gothic rock band Corpus Delicti.

Track listing

Corpus Delicti (band) albums
1994 albums